Ian Robinson (born 12 September 1952) is a former English professional squash player.

Ian was born in York on 12 September 1952 and lives in Liphook, Hampshire. He first played squash in 1961 at St Peters School, York and was champion of Yorkshire eight times. He represented Great Britain during the 1976, 1977 & 1981 World Team Squash Championships.

References

External links
 

English male squash players
1952 births
Living people
Sportspeople from York
People from Liphook